Johanna Karimäki (born 20 March 1973 in Geneva) is a Finnish politician representing the Green League. She was elected to the Finnish Parliament in the parliamentary election of March 2007. She has also been a member of the municipal council of Espoo since 2005.

References

External links 
Home page

1973 births
Living people
Politicians from Geneva
Green League politicians
Members of the Parliament of Finland (2007–11)
Members of the Parliament of Finland (2011–15)
Members of the Parliament of Finland (2015–19)
21st-century Finnish women politicians